Onion Creek may refer to:

 Onion Creek, Texas, a census-designated place
 Onion Creek (Texas), a small tributary stream of the Colorado River
 Onion Creek Bridge, the former name of the bridge at Moore's Crossing
 Onion Creek School District in Washington